The women's 10 kilometre freestyle cross-country skiing competition at the 2010 Winter Olympics in Vancouver, Canada was held on February 15 at Whistler Olympic Park in Whistler, British Columbia at 10:00 PST.

Each skier starts at 30-second intervals, skiing the entire 10 kilometre course. Estonia's Kristina Šmigun-Vähi was the defending Olympic champion in this event though it was held in the classical style. Aino-Kaisa Saarinen on Finland was the defending world champion though that event was also held in the classical style. The final World Cup event in women's 10 km freestyle prior to the 2010 Games took place on February 5 at Canmore, Alberta and was won by Sweden's Charlotte Kalla.

Šmigun-Vähi won silver in this event, Saarinen would finish 15th, and Kalla would win gold. Kalla is the Sweden's first female individual gold medalist in cross-country skiing since Toini Gustafsson's 5 km win at Grenoble in 1968.

Results

References

External links
2010 Winter Olympics results: Ladies' 10 km Free, from https://web.archive.org/web/20100222080013/http://www.vancouver2010.com/ retrieved 2010-02-15.
2010 Winter Olympics February 14 2010 Cross-country skiing women's 10 km freestyle start list

Women's cross-country skiing at the 2010 Winter Olympics
Women's 10 kilometre cross-country skiing at the Winter Olympics